Neil McArthur (19 March 1898 – 2 April 1974) was a New Zealand association football player who represented New Zealand at international level.

McArthur made his full All Whites debut in a 3–1 win over Australia on 22 July 1922 and played just one further official international, also against Australia, losing 1–2 on 7 June 1923.

He went on to introduce and be the managing director of New Zealand's national lottery.

References

1898 births
1974 deaths
New Zealand association footballers
New Zealand international footballers
Association footballers not categorized by position